The Midland Railway 483 Class 4-4-0 was a class of steam locomotive designed by Henry Fowler for passenger work on the Midland Railway. The class were nominally "rebuilds" of various earlier classes designed by Samuel W. Johnson, although the '483' class engines were, unquestionably, 'accountancy rebuilds' (effectively new locos 'disguised' to gain routine expenditure approval from the board). This design formed the basis for the later LMS Class 2P 4-4-0.

Construction of the first batch of this class was authorised by Midland Railway Order O/3942 dated 21 June 1911: 'Please put your work in hand in connection with rebuilding engines 483–522 with new frames, new cylinders and G7 boilers fitted with Schmidt's superheaters.' Apart from the savings made by using the parts that were salvaged from the old engines, there was an added benefit in referring to them as rebuilt since the royalties due to the superheater company were lower for modified locomotives than for new ones. This first batch of locomotives previously formed the 150 class. Their rebuilding to Class 483 took place 1912-1913.

Four more batches of rebuilds were authorised; in 1912, 1913, 1914 and 1922. The London, Midland and Scottish Railway (LMS) inherited these locomotives at the Grouping of the railways in 1923, completing the last of these rebuilds in 1924.

Some of them duly passed into British Railways (BR) ownership in 1948.

Numbering

 BR numbers 40332-40397 (17 locomotives) originally built 1882–1891, some rebuilt from 1910 onwards
 BR numbers 40400-40562 (143 locomotives) originally built 1891–1901, all rebuilt between 1912 and 1923
 BR numbers 40322-40326 (5 locomotives) built for Somerset and Dorset Joint Railway 1914-1921 and taken into LMS stock in 1930

Note: two of the above number series contain gaps so the totals do not tally.

Rebuilding
On rebuilding, the Stephenson valve gear was retained but the following changes were made:
  cylinders with slide valves were replaced by  cylinders with piston valves.
  driving wheels were replaced by  driving wheels.
 A superheater was fitted.

References

External links

 Class 2P-AB Details at Rail UK, Older locos
 Class 2P-AC Details at Rail UK, Newer locos
 Class 2P-AA Details at Rail UK, Somerset and Dorset locos

0483
Somerset and Dorset Joint Railway locomotives
4-4-0 locomotives
Railway locomotives introduced in 1882
Standard gauge steam locomotives of Great Britain
2′B h2 locomotives
Scrapped locomotives
Passenger locomotives